Tigrosa grandis is a species of wolf spider (Lycosidae) endemic to the United States, where it occurs from Montana, east to Missouri, and south to Texas.

References

Lycosidae
Spiders of the United States
Spiders described in 1894